Dermeh is a village in Aliabad Rural District, Khafr District, Jahrom County, Fars Province, Iran. At the 2006 census, its population was 493, in 129 families.

References 

Populated places in  Jahrom County